Leyland Lion can refer to either of two types of bus chassis

Leyland Lion PSR1, a rear-engined single-deck chassis built between 1960 and 1967
Leyland-DAB Lion, mid-engined double deck bus chassis manufactured between 1986 and 1988.

See also
 List of Leyland buses